Juandalynn Givan is an American lawyer and politician. She serves as a Democratic member of the Alabama House of Representatives, where she represents Jefferson County.

At a committee meeting in March 2017, Givan said that African-Americans were more likely to get arrested for marijuana possession. She was accused of "play(ing) the race card" by former Representative Richard Laird, and she asked him not to attend meetings any more.

In May 2017, she opposed the bill for the Alabama Memorial Preservation Act, which would make it harder to remove Confederate monuments in Alabama; she argued, "This type of legislation ... continues to put Alabama in a negative light, which it is known for racism, discrimination."

On January 27, 2022, the Givan asked for the resignation of Brookside's mayor, judge, and prosecutor. She stated "[The police of Brookside] have been stopping residents... harassing them, giving exorbitant numbers in their [fee structure] in the city of Brookside." She commented on the racial profiling and harassment of women. Following this, she began to call for an investigation by Steve Marshall, noting that "many outlets have already sent a request to him to take a greater role in this issue." Following this, she called on the mayor of Brookside to leave for not speaking to the general public, media or citizens of Brookside. She also shared her concern for the community of Forestdale saying that they had consistently endured "torture and harassment" from the police department. During this statement, she emphasized the importance of the topic stating how crucial the last two years have been concerning "police brutality, police murder, police involved incidents, as well as the killing of George Floyd and others at the hand of law enforcement." She also asked for Jim Wooten's resignation "because he has aided and abetted in this miscarriage of justice." She followed this by stating, "We have a division with the State Bar for professional responsibility and I want to make sure that neither of these men have fallen below such a standard that they have violated the rights of the citizens who depend and believe in their leadership.”

References

External links

Living people
People from Jefferson County, Alabama
Miles College alumni
Democratic Party members of the Alabama House of Representatives
Women state legislators in Alabama
Year of birth missing (living people)
21st-century American politicians
21st-century American women politicians
African-American state legislators in Alabama